The Bohotin is a right tributary of the river Prut in Romania. It flows into the Prut in Gura Bohotin, near Gorban.

References

Rivers of Romania
Rivers of Iași County
Tributaries of the Prut